Moses Kenneth Haughton Jr. better known by his stage name Moses Stone (born October 19, 1986) is an American recording artist, music producer, entrepreneur, and actor. Moses Stone is the founder of brands Art Sky Agency (Creative Digital Agency ), Art Sky Entertainment (Record Label), Art Sky Productions (Music Production & Licensing) he founded in 2013. Stone has appeared on MTV, BET, Showtime At The Apollo, NBC'S The Voice, Nickelodeon.

Born in Washington, D.C. and raised in Maryland. His ethnicity is Jamaican American, his parents mother Renita R. Lattimore being from the United States and his father Moses Haughton, Sr. being from Kingston Jamaica.

Life and career

2019: McDonald's Black and Positively Golden (We Are Golden) Campaign Hit Theme Song "We Golden" Ambassador/Voice 
Moses partnered up with McDonald's as the ambassador and voice for the Black & Positively Golden Campaign/Movement, which is focused on education, empowerment and entrepreneurship, replaces the 365Black platform that McDonald's began using in 2003. Stone created the anthem & theme song "We Golden" for the campaign which was the #1 rated commercial for African Americans in over 16 years the song with impactful & uplifting lyrics like "Black & So Excellent" "Melanated We Shine""So Excellent & Divine and Yea, We Golden" invoking change and empowerment for minorities the commercial "Black & Positively Golden" is now airing on National TV and Radio all over the US. The commercial premiered March 30 for the 50th NAACP Image Awards To Air Live On TV ONE.

This is Mcdonald's biggest overhaul in 16 years Stone performed the theme song for Black & Positively Golden Day On March 29, McDonald's kicks off Black & Positively Golden Day in Los Angeles with a special day of fun. The YWCA in Leimert Park, recently renamed after civil rights activist Rosa Parks, will host the exciting festivities featuring musical artists, McDonald's food, a collaborative mural creation and more. Join us live or follow @wearegolden on Instagram.

2015 - 2016: McDonald's Summer & Winter Ambassador
Stone partnered up with McDonald's as the ambassador for the Summer, he performed and produced the music for their commercial "Summer & Lovin" McDonald's new summer special $2.50 Double Cheeseburger and Small Fries the commercial is now airing on National TV and Radio all over the US. The commercial premiered on the NBA Finals for over 20.4 million viewers.

After Summer, McDonald's picked up Stone for two more spots for there brand new All Day Breakfast campaign, and extended his $2.50 commercial for the Winter with revised lyrics for the winter 2015 through 2016.

2012: The Voice
He was a contestant on the Emmy winning show the second season of NBC's The Voice, making history by being the first ever rapper and singer in the show's history. On Team Xtina he was mentored and coached by the legendary Christina Aguilera. He made it to the first live show before he was eliminated.

2012 - present: after The Voice
After The Voice he released his first single "My Moment" and went on to perform live on Showtime Championship Boxing for the main event Lateef Kayode vs. Antonio Tarver fight at the Home Depot Center in California.  Later he released his highly anticipated mixtape Resilient. As a songwriter and music producer he has had music placed on TV shows and networks.  His song "So Bad" was featured on Bad Girls Club and music production on Keeping Up with the Kardashians, My Super Sweet 16, MTV and VH1 etc.. He has released his new single "Young and Invincible Feat Lisa Scinta" featured on Young Hollywood. In 2014, his follow up mixtape Resilient 2 will be released.  He is currently in the studio working on his summer EP.

Biography
Moses Haughton Jr better known by his stage name "Moses Stone" is a recording artist/actor/music producer and entrepreneur who incorporates elements of hip hop and pop music as a rapper, singer, and musician.

Stone has been involved in music since he was six, when he was first introduced to rap music by his older cousin. He developed his art form through writing and producing his own music and songs. He is devoted to perfecting his craft/art, exhibiting a passion for various topics from good-time party vibes to social awareness to create a new sound that brings a fun, exciting and positive atmosphere to his fans.

He had success at a young age, then known as "Young Moses" (a.k.a. "That Dude Young Moses"), as an acclaimed performer who appeared on MTV's, Say What? Karaoke, and B.E.T.'s 106 & Park Wild Out Wednesday, where he earned first place in competitions.

Stone's ability to perform helped him capture his audience at the world-famous "Showtime at the Apollo" in New York City. He also appeared on the radio station 96.3 WHUR, performed at the 2004 Motorfest in Virginia, as well as at local recreational centers and nightclubs throughout the Maryland, Virginia, and D.C. area. He also opened for LeToya Luckett, former member of the Grammy Award-winning group Destiny's Child, at Hunter College in New York City. Stone performed on CBS's Showtime for a Championship fight Nationwide at the Home Depot Center in front of 18,800.

Born in Washington, D.C. and raised in Prince George's County, Maryland, he attended and graduated from Laurel High School in Laurel, Maryland in 2004.  Afterwards he moved to Hollywood where he attended Musicians Institute. There he played with various musical genres and artists including rock, pop, r&b, hip hop, indie, alternative, jazz, funk, electronica, reggae and reggae-ton etc.

While there he also started an indie/hip hop band called Every Thursday, then landed an internship at Universal Music Group Distribution, and very quickly moved up the ranks and was hired as a project manager guiding a team of interns dealing with projects from Universal Records, Universal Music Gospel, Machete Music, Universal Music Latin and Fontana Distribution. He gained a substantial amount of knowledge in the music industry working at the forefront company of the entertainment business.

Stone was recently on Season 2 of The Voice on legendary recording artist Christina Aguilera's team (Team Xtina).  Stone was the first MC/singer to be on the show. He also was mentored by the legend Lionel Richie where he gained confidence in his singing abilities and in the industry.  Stone was seen by millions of people from around the world and he gained a substantial amount of knowledge from his coach Aguilera. The show has since been nominated for an Emmy award and pulled in some of the highest ratings this season.

Stone strongly believes in community awareness, and actively participates in various fundraisers and charity events, such as Kicks 4 Kids, and fundraising for domestic violence and abuse awareness.  He also performs at benefit concerts and attends several events to give back.

Since achieving some of his goals, and always looking to reach greater heights in his career and life, he has ventured into the business side of entertainment as CEO/Founder of his new entertainment company ARTSKY ENTERTAINMENT where he creates music, films, commercials and more, capitalizing on all of the things he has learned in his career.  With the entertainment business changing constantly, he wants to be a part of the change to help bring creativity back to the industry and to help move pop culture. Focused on his brand as an artist and his newly formed entertainment company, he plans to leave a legacy behind of his work and contributions to the world.

Discography 
 Soon You'll Understand] (2017)
 Young Moses (2004)
 Chapter 2 Through the Eyes of a Minor (2006)
 Warrior (2015)

 Singles 
 Only One (2019)
 We Golden (2019)
 Come Alive (2019)
 Still (2019)
 Gone (2018)
 Big City (2017)
 You Got It Feat Gabby Moe (2015)
 My Moment (2012)

 Mixtapes 
 The Audition' (2010)
 Resiient (2012)
 Soon You'll Understand (2016)

Filmography

References

External links
 
 

American rappers
The Voice (franchise) contestants
1986 births
Living people
21st-century American singers
21st-century American rappers